To Crush the Moon is a 2005 hard science fiction novel by Wil McCarthy, the last in the four-part Queendom of Sol series.  It was nominated for the 2007 Nebula Award for Best Novel.

References

2005 American novels
2005 science fiction novels
American science fiction novels
Novels by Wil McCarthy
Hard science fiction
Bantam Spectra books